The Year My Parents Went on Vacation is a 2006 Brazilian drama film directed by Cao Hamburger. The screenplay, which took four years to be completed, was written by Hamburger, Adriana Falcão, Claudio Galperin, Anna Muylaert and Bráulio Mantovani.

It was submitted by the Ministry of Culture for the 2007 Academy Award for Best Foreign Language Film. This choice was unexpected, since it was thought that José Padilha's Elite Squad would be submitted.

Plot
The story takes place entirely during a few months in 1970, in the city of São Paulo. Mauro, a 12-year-old boy, is suddenly deprived of the company of his young parents, Bia and Daniel Stein, who are political activists on the run from the harsh military government, which was strongly repressing leftists all over the country. Against this backdrop of fear and political persecution, the country is at the same time bursting with enthusiasm for the upcoming World Cup, to be held in Mexico, the first one to be transmitted live via satellite.

Unable to take care of their only child, the Steins, who live in Belo Horizonte, drive all the way to São Paulo to deliver the boy to his paternal grandfather, Mótel, who is a barber. To their son, they say they will travel on vacation and promise to return for the World Cup games. However, the grandfather dies on the same day the boy arrives, and he is left clueless and without support in Bom Retiro, a working-class neighborhood inhabited mainly by Jews, many of whom speak Yiddish, an unknown language to the boy. As his father is Jewish, the close-knit Bom Retiro community rally in support of the child and Shlomo, a solitary elder and religious Jew who was a close neighbor and friend of Mauro's grandfather, assumes the care of Mauro.

Mauro is a football enthusiast and wants to be a goalkeeper. He gradually mixes in with other neighborhood children and becomes acquainted with a number of colorful characters, including Hanna, a girl his age; Ítalo, a politically active student from the Pontifical Catholic University of São Paulo; Irene, a beautiful female bartender and her boyfriend, the mulatto ace goalkeeper of one of the local football teams; the local rabbi and assorted Jewish elders, Italian immigrants, and so on.

To Mauro's great disappointment, his parents neither appear as promised at the World Cup nor give any notice. Fearing the worst, Shlomo starts to investigate by himself and is arrested by the political police because of his meddling. Finally, he achieves the release of Mauro's mother, who is severely ill after the prison term. Her reunion with her child happens on the very same day as Brazil's final victory at the World Cup. (Mauro's father disappears while in the dictatorship's clutches, never to return.) At the end of the film, Mauro says farewell to his recent friends and playmates as he and his mother leave Bom Retiro and prepare to go into exile.

Cast
 Michel Joelsas as Mauro
 Germano Haiut as Shlomo 
 Daniela Piepszyk as Hanna
 Caio Blat as Ítalo
 Liliana Castro as Irene
 Paulo Autran as Mótel, Mauro's grandfather
 Simone Spoladore as Bia, Mauro's mother
 Eduardo Moreira as Daniel, Mauro's father

Production
The film is semi-autobiographical; the director's parents, physicists and professors at the University of São Paulo, were briefly arrested by the military in the same year of 1970, accused of lending support to "subversives". The couple's five children — including Cao Hamburger, the director, who was 8 years old — came under the care of their grandmothers, one Jewish and one Italian Catholic.

Critical reception
The film has received mostly positive reviews. Based on 52 reviews collected by the film review aggregator Rotten Tomatoes, 83% of critics gave The Year My Parents Went on Vacation a positive review (43 "Fresh"; 9 "Rotten"), with an average rating of 7.1/10.

Deborah Young of Variety hailed the film as "sensitive, delicate and involving", going on to say that "Hamburger feels no need (nor is there any) to underline the obvious. He has a magician's ability to keep the story light and believable". It also notes that "the humorous central part of the screenplay is bereft of surprises".

The film was picked as Brazil's submission for the 2007 Academy Award for Best Foreign Language Film (and was shortlisted alongside nine other films), and was released on February 8, 2008 in the United States and Canada.

Awards and nominations

 Audience Award - 2006 Rio de Janeiro International Film Festival
 Best Film - 2006 São Paulo International Film Festival
 Audience Award - 2007 Lima International Film Festival, Peru
 Special Jury Award - 2006 São Paulo International Film Festival
 Best Cinematography - 2007 ABC Cinematography Award
 Best Art Direction - 2007 ABC Cinematography Award
 Best Young Performer - 2007 Young Artist Awards
 Best Editing - 2007 ABC Cinematography Award
 Best Sound - 2007 ABC Cinematography Award
 Best Screenplay - 2007 São Paulo Association of Art Critics Awards
 Golden Bear (Nominated) - 2007 Berlin International Film Festival

See also
 List of Brazilian submissions for the Academy Award for Best International Feature Film

References

External links
 
 
 
 

2006 films
2006 drama films
2000s coming-of-age drama films
2000s Portuguese-language films
Brazilian coming-of-age drama films
Films about Brazilian military dictatorship
Films about missing people
Films directed by Cao Hamburger
Films set in 1970
Films set in São Paulo
Films shot in São Paulo